Andrew de Guldeford was Lord Warden of the Cinque Ports at some time between 1364 and 1376, probably from 1371 to 1372.

On 28 August 1343, King Edward III ruled on an action involving de Guldeford which was regarded as piracy. English conflict with Scotland had made the Isle of Man a target for the Scots who had made demands on the community for monies to keep the peace. Three hundred marks were dispatched in two ships bound for Scotland with livestock and other goods. The fine was for the period of one year, but was intercepted before it reached Scotland by de Guldeford of Waterford, and his accomplices, including John de Bristol and Thomas Sloghtre of Ulton. John Jolens and his son Robert, Adam Serle of Drogheda, and Hugh Pyrotson of Ulton, were also named as being present, with three ships from Ireland.
 
De Guldeford claimed his ships to be amongst 'the guardians of the sea', but offered no warrant or authority to this effect, and proceeded to board the Manx ships by force of arms, removing the money, and goods, and taking away with him one of the Manx ships. Further, the pirates carried off a number of the Manx men with them back to Ireland, where they were imprisoned.

De Guldeford later served as Lord Warden of the Cinque Ports. Piracy is a charge often levelled against the Cinque Ports during the 14th century. It is not certain that de Guldeford was at the time of the incident in any way associated with the Cinque Ports.

References

Further reading
:Isle of Man

Lords Warden of the Cinque Ports
Year of birth unknown
Year of death unknown
14th-century English Navy personnel